The 2021–22 season is the club's fifth season since its establishment in 2017, and their fifth season in the Indian Super League.

Background

Players

Current squad

Out on loan

Pre-season and friendlies

Competitions

Overview

Durand Cup

Group stage

Matches

Indian Super League

League table

League Results by Round

Matches 
Note: The initial fixtures were announced in September 2021, and the rest of the matches in December. But the fixtures were revised in January 2022 after a series of COVID-19 cases led to the postponement of several matches.

Indian Super League Playoffs

Matches

Statistics

Jamshedpur FC claimed a number of records this season ie Most no of wins in a row, Least goals conceded in a season, and the Highest Goal Difference of the 2021-22 ISL season.

Goal scorers

Clean sheets

Notes

References 

Jamshedpur FC seasons
2021–22 Indian Super League season by team